Joël Ngoy Kitenge (born 12 November 1987) is a Luxembourgian international footballer who plays for Jeunesse Useldange, as a striker.

Early and personal life
Kitenge was born in Kinshasa, Zaire.

Club career
Kitenge has played club football in Luxembourg, France, the Netherlands and Germany for CS Oberkorn, FC Villefranche, FC Lienden, FC Emmendingen, CS Fola Esch, F91 Dudelange, CS Grevenmacher and Jeunesse Useldange.

International career
Kitenge made his international debut for Luxembourg in 2005, earning 29 caps between then and 2011. He appeared for them in FIFA World Cup qualifying matches.

References

1987 births
Living people
Footballers from Kinshasa
Democratic Republic of the Congo emigrants to Luxembourg
Luxembourgian footballers
Luxembourg international footballers
CS Oberkorn players
FC Villefranche Beaujolais players
FC Lienden players
FC Emmendingen players
CS Fola Esch players
F91 Dudelange players
CS Grevenmacher players
Luxembourg Division of Honour players
Championnat National 3 players
Luxembourg National Division players
Association football forwards
Luxembourgian expatriate footballers
Luxembourgian expatriate sportspeople in France
Expatriate footballers in France
Luxembourgian expatriate sportspeople in the Netherlands
Expatriate footballers in the Netherlands
Luxembourgian expatriate sportspeople in Germany
Expatriate footballers in Germany